Leo Hönigsberg (born in 1861, died in 1911) was a famous Croatian architect and co-owner of the architecture studio Hönigsberg & Deutsch.

Early life and family
Hönigsberg was born in Zagreb, Austro-Hungarian Monarchy, to a Croatian-Jewish family. He studied in Vienna at the Technische Hochschule (today the Vienna University of Technology) under Heinrich von Ferstel where he graduated in 1883. Hönigsberg trained at the studios of Ludwig Tischler and Anton Krones.

Later years
In 1887 Hönigsberg returned to Zagreb where he worked with Julio Deutsch, at Kuno Waidmann's studio on the recommendation of Hermann Helmer. In 1889 Hönigsberg and Deutsch founded the Hönigsberg & Deutsch bureau, which soon grew into one of the largest building companies in Zagreb.

After the death of Hönigsberg, in 1911, the studio was taken over by Deutsch. Hönigsberg was buried at the Mirogoj Cemetery.

See also
 Hönigsberg & Deutsch
 Julio Deutsch

References

Bibliography

 
 

Architects from Zagreb
Jewish architects
.
1861 births
1911 deaths
Burials at Mirogoj Cemetery
Croatian Jews
Austro-Hungarian Jews
Croatian Austro-Hungarians